SS Samlorian was a Liberty ship built in the United States during World War II. She was transferred to the British Ministry of War Transportation (MoWT) upon completion.

Construction
Samlorian was laid down on 1 April 1944, under a Maritime Commission (MARCOM) contract, MC hull 2358, by J.A. Jones Construction, Brunswick, Georgia; sponsored by Mrs. A.M. Harris, and launched on 14 May 1944.

History
She was allocated to E.R. Management Co., on 26 May 1944. On 20 June 1947, she was sold to the Strath Steamship Co., for commercial use. She was scrapped in 1966.

References

Bibliography

 
 
 
 
 

 

Liberty ships
Ships built in Brunswick, Georgia
1944 ships
Liberty ships transferred to the British Ministry of War Transport